East Midlands 2 was a tier 10 English Rugby Union league with teams from Bedfordshire, Northamptonshire and parts of Cambridgeshire taking part.  Promoted teams moved up to East Midlands 1 and relegated teams dropped to East Midlands 3 until that division was cancelled at the end of the 1991–92 season.  Restructuring of the East Midlands leagues at the end of the 2003–04 campaign meant that East Midlands 2 was discontinued and the majority of teams transferred into the new East Midlands/South Leicestershire 2 division.

Original teams

When league rugby began in 1987, this division contained the following teams:

Brackley
Corby
Cutler Hammer
Deepings
Northampton Casuals
Northampton Men's Own
Old Wellingburians
Oundle
Sharnbrook & Colworth
St Ives
Vauxhall Motors

East Midlands 2 honours

East Midlands 1 (1987–1992)

The original East Midlands 2 was a tier 9 league.  Promotion was to East Midlands 1 and relegation to East Midlands 3. At the end of the 1991–92 season all of the East Midlands and Leicestershire leagues were merged and most sides in East Midlands 2 transferred to the new East Midlands/Leicestershire 2.

East Midlands 2 (2000–2004)

After a gap of seven years East Midlands 2 was reintroduced ahead of the 2000–01 season as a tier 10 league.  Promotion was to East Midlands 1 and there was no relegation.  East Midlands 2 was cancelled at the end of the 2003–04 campaign and most teams transferred into the new East Midlands/South Leicestershire 2.

Number of league titles

Biddenham (1)
Corby (1)
Kempston (1)
Northampton Casuals (1)
Northampton Men's Own (1)
Rushden & Higham (1)
St Neots (1)
Vauxhall Motors (1)
Wellingborough Old Grammarians (1)

Notes

See also
East Midlands 1
East Midlands 3
Midlands RFU
East Midlands RFU
English rugby union system
Rugby union in England

References

External links
 East Midlands Rugby Union official website

10
Rugby union in Bedfordshire
Rugby union in Cambridgeshire
Rugby union in Northamptonshire
Sports leagues established in 1987
Sports leagues disestablished in 2004